Kassem Hachem (born 1960) is a Lebanese politician, member of the Arab Socialist Baath Party.

Biography
Hachem was born in Chebaa. He studied dentistry at Damascus University. He is the head of the West Bekaa-Centre branch of the Baath Party. He was elected to parliament in 2000, 2005 and 2009.

References

1960 births
Living people
Members of the Parliament of Lebanon
Arab Socialist Ba'ath Party – Lebanon Region politicians
People from Hasbaya District
Damascus University alumni
Lebanese Sunni Muslims